Metarctia burungae is a moth of the subfamily Arctiinae. It was described by Hubert Robert Debauche in 1942. It is found in the Democratic Republic of the Congo and Uganda.

References

 

Metarctia
Moths described in 1942